Pierre de Bénouville (8 August 1914 – 4 December 2001) was a French Army officer, member of the Resistance, author, and politician.

Burials at Passy Cemetery
Companions of the Liberation
1914 births
2001 deaths
Military personnel from Amsterdam
People affiliated with Action Française
Rally of the French People politicians
Rally for the Republic politicians
Deputies of the 2nd National Assembly of the French Fourth Republic
Deputies of the 1st National Assembly of the French Fifth Republic
Deputies of the 4th National Assembly of the French Fifth Republic
Deputies of the 5th National Assembly of the French Fifth Republic
Deputies of the 6th National Assembly of the French Fifth Republic
Deputies of the 7th National Assembly of the French Fifth Republic
Deputies of the 8th National Assembly of the French Fifth Republic
Deputies of the 9th National Assembly of the French Fifth Republic
French generals
French military personnel of World War II
French Resistance members
Grand Officiers of the Légion d'honneur
Union for the New Republic politicians
Union of Democrats for the Republic politicians
Members of Parliament for Paris